The 1984 Tulsa Golden Hurricane football team represented the University of Tulsa during the 1984 NCAA Division I-A football season. In their seventh and final year under head coach John Cooper, the Golden Hurricane compiled a 6–5 record (5–0 against conference opponents) and won the Missouri Valley Conference championship.

The team's statistical leaders included Richie Stephenson with 1,134 passing yards, Gordon Brown with 995 rushing yards, and Ronnie Kelley with 675 yards. Head coach John Cooper was later inducted into the College Football Hall of Fame.

Schedule

References

Tulsa
Tulsa Golden Hurricane football seasons
Missouri Valley Conference football champion seasons
Tulsa Golden Hurricane football